The Cortège is an album by the Mike Westbrook Orchestra, performing a composition for jazz orchestra composed by Westbrook with texts from Federico Garcia Lorca, Arthur Rimbaud, Hermann Hesse, William Blake, Giuseppe Gioachino Belli, John Clare, Pentti Saarikoski, and other European poetry, which was recorded in 1982 and first released as a triple LP on the Original label and reissued as a double CD on Enja in 1993 and 2011.

Reception

The Allmusic review by Dave Lynch called it "an often stunning work of massive scope and an indisputable highlight of Westbrook's career" and stated "The Cortège might be too sprawling for a first investigation of Westbrook, but it warrants consideration as the centerpiece of any Westbrook collection".

On All About Jazz Chris May called it "one of finest achievements of British orchestral jazz".

The Observer's Dave Gelly noted "It's only recently that the evolution of distinctly European forms of jazz has been acknowledged, but it began decades ago. One of the first milestones was this huge, unsettling work. .... The Cortège evolved over several years and, if there is a definitive version, this 1982 recording is it".

Track listing
All compositions by Mike Westbrook
 "It Starts Here" – 5:18
 "Democratie" – 7:55
 "Berlin 16.2.79" – 9:25
 "Erme Estuary" – 8:40
 "Guitar Solo" – 2:31
 "Knivshult/Ash Wednesday" – 4:54
 "Ruote Che Girano" – 6:48
 "Piano" – 3:06
 "Leñador" – 11:32
 "July '79" – 12:49
 "Enface" – 14:03
 "Cordoba" – 8:11
 "Santarcangelo: Free as Bird" – 1:18
 "Santarcangelo: Evening" – 1:35
 "Santarcangelo: Jerusalem" – 2:27
 "Santarcangelo: Dawn" – 1:50
 "Santarcangelo: Piped Music" – 3:35
 "Santarcangelo: Dirge" – 0:55
 "Santarcangelo: Didn't He Ramble" – 1:41
 "Santarcangelo: Cadenza" – 3:39
 "Kyrie" – 6:12
 "A Hearth Burns: The Toper's Rant" – 8:49
 "A Hearth Burns: Une Vie" – 1:15
 "Graffitti" – 6:24
 "Duet" – 2:45

Personnel
Mike Westbrook – piano, tuba
Phil Minton – trumpet, voice
Dave Plews, Guy Barker, Dick Pearce – trumpet
Malcolm Griffiths – trombone
Kate Westbrook – tenor horn, piccolo, bamboo flute, voice
Alan Sinclair, Dave Powell – tuba
Chris Hunter, Phil Todd, Chris Biscoe – saxophones
Lindsay Cooper – bassoon, oboe, saxophone
Brian Godding – guitar
Georgie Born – cello
Steve Cook – bass
Dave Barry – drums

References

1982 albums
Mike Westbrook albums
Enja Records albums